is a former Japanese football player.

Playing career
Kurita was born in Shizuoka Prefecture on March 3, 1975. After graduating from Shizuoka Gakuen High School, he joined Kashima Antlers in 1993. Although he played as defensive midfielder, he could not play many matches behind Yasuto Honda and Jorginho. From 1998, he played for Kyoto Purple Sanga (1998), Consadole Sapporo (1999), Shimizu S-Pulse (2000) and Yokohama FC (2001). In 2002, he moved to Mito HollyHock and played as regular player until 2004. In 2005, his opportunity to play decreased. In 2006, he moved to Japan Football League club FC Ryukyu. He played as regular player until 2007. His opportunity to play decreased in 2008 and he retired end of 2008 season.

Club statistics

References

External links

awx.jp

1975 births
Living people
Association football people from Shizuoka Prefecture
Japanese footballers
J1 League players
J2 League players
Japan Football League players
Kashima Antlers players
Kyoto Sanga FC players
Hokkaido Consadole Sapporo players
Shimizu S-Pulse players
Yokohama FC players
Mito HollyHock players
FC Ryukyu players
Association football midfielders